Aster is unisex given name and a surname. It may refer to:

Given name
 Aster Aweke (born 1959), Ethiopian singer
 Aster Fissehatsion (born 1951), Eritrean politician and political prisoner
 Aster Ganno ( 1872–1964), Ethiopian Bible translator
 Aster Janssens (born 2001), Belgian footballer
 Aster Yohannes, Eritrean political prisoner

Surname
 Ari Aster (born 1986), American filmmaker and screenwriter
 Ernst Ludwig von Aster (1778–1855), German army officer
 Jeannette Aster (born 1948), Austrian-Canadian opera director
 Jon C. Aster, American pathologist
 Misha Aster (born 1978), Canadian opera and classical music producer, director, writer and educator
 Richard Aster, American seismologist and professor

References

Feminine given names
German-language surnames